Cinna latifolia is a species of grass known by the common name drooping woodreed. It is a native bunchgrass to the Northern Hemisphere, where it has a circumboreal distribution. It grows in moist habitat, such as forest understory and riverbanks. It reaches nearly two meters in maximum height. The inflorescence is an open array of spikelets generally green to purple-tinted in color. It flowers in late summer and fall.

References

External links
Jepson Manual Treatment
USDA Plants Profile
Photo gallery

Pooideae
Bunchgrasses of North America
Native grasses of California
Grasses of the United States
Grasses of Canada